The Augusta Botanical Gardens (formerly the Georgia Golf Hall of Fame Botanical Gardens) is a  botanical garden located in downtown Augusta, Georgia.

Until July 2007, it contained display gardens along the banks of the Savannah River, and include a rose garden with over 800 miniature rose varieties, as well as sculptures of famous golfers Raymond Floyd, Ben Hogan, Bobby Jones, Byron Nelson, Jack Nicklaus, and Arnold Palmer.

Because of financial problems, the Georgia Golf Hall of Fame closed the gardens. Most of the plants died because they were not watered. On September 6, 2007, the sculptures were removed and placed in a maintenance shed on the property, where they remain to this day. The property is still owned by the state, though there is no funding for its upkeep.

On June 6, 2009, after a well-publicized eight-day battle with state agencies, the Georgia Golf Hall of Fame allowed a group of two dozen citizens to enter the property to cut the grass.  Residents of Augusta and the surrounding areas continue to maintain parts of the property for free, even though the Georgia Golf Hall of Fame will not allow them to use the property except to maintain it.

There have been proposals by some city officials and by GA Gov. Sonny Perdue to redevelop some Botanical Gardens property for the construction of a new baseball stadium for the Augusta GreenJackets. The proposed stadium, designed by Cal Ripken Jr. would incorporate the Gardens in its design. The new stadium's turf management crew is proposed to maintain the gardens as part of the stadium's operating responsibilities.

The site has now been developed as the home of the Georgia Cyber Center, a two building office complex which is host to multiple cybersecurity companies as well as cybersecurity and information technology programs at Augusta University and Augusta Technical College.

See also

 List of botanical gardens in the United States

External links
 Augusta Botanical Gardens — AugustaGA.gov
 Georgia Golf Hall of Fame
  - Bring Baseball Downtown

Botanical gardens in Georgia (U.S. state)
Geography of Augusta, Georgia
Protected areas of Richmond County, Georgia